Fort William Collegiate Institute (FWCI) was a collegiate institute operated by the Lakehead District School Board in Thunder Bay, Ontario from 1907 to 2005. The school's teams were called the "FWCI Blue Bears". The building was granted Historical Heritage Site status in 1983, and was designated a historic building on May 15, 1983.

History

During its many years of operation, the Fort William Collegiate Institute went through various additions and renovations. The original building, which was eight or ten classrooms, underwent massive reconstruction in 1918. A second addition was constructed in 1925, and a third in 1970.

In 1986, the Secondary School Board recommended that the Fort William Collegiate Institute be closed after the school year finished. The school would not end up closing as dominant groups in Thunder Bay were sending their children to the collegiate and their pressure, along with the mystique of the school,  made its closure all but impossible. In 2005, due to high school enrollment decreasing throughout Thunder Bay, the Lakehead District School Board advised the school be closed. It was decided that two high schools in the South Ward, Westgate Collegiate & Vocational Institute and Sir Winston Churchill Collegiate & Vocational Institute, instead of three would be sufficient to handle the students. It was recommended that Fort William Collegiate Institute close due to the costly repairs and renovations it would require to function, and has been closed since the 2004–2005 school year.
This school was considered in the community to be the school to attend if one had university aspirations, with phenomenal teaching staff. It was the only high school in the area without shop or technical level classes. In a city where the majority identified as blue collar, this school distinguished itself as being the school to teach the future leaders of the community.

See also 
 Education in Thunder Bay, Ontario

References

External links 

High schools in Thunder Bay